"Johnny P's Caddy" is a song by American rappers Benny the Butcher and J. Cole. It was released on January 28, 2022 as the lead single from the former's third studio album Tana Talk 4. The song was produced by The Alchemist, and is Benny the Butcher's first song to chart on the Billboard Hot 100.

Background
The title of the song refers to an old school Cadillac that Benny the Butcher's father owned when the rapper was an adolescent. According to Benny, his father would drive him and fellow rapper Westside Gunn around while playing music for them, which significantly developed his passion for music.

Lyrics
Lyrically, the song finds the rappers reflecting on their rise to fame, encountering obstacles along the way, and their success and impact on the hip hop industry and their fans. Benny the Butcher begins his verse rapping about his past life of drug dealing and becoming a rapper (This ain't my story 'bout rags to riches, more 'bout how I mastered physics / In the game, I used to train like Rocky, catchin' chickens / I was nice, but they was right when they told me that rap a business / I had ten bands in my stash when I passed over half a million"). J. Cole criticizes rappers who lie about being involved in street life and dealing drugs, and ends his verse proclaiming he is the "best rapper alive".

Music video
The music video sees Benny the Butcher and J. Cole in a house "bathed in natural light". Benny raps outside as he watches a man getting arrested, while Cole performs inside the house.

Charts

References

2022 singles
2022 songs
J. Cole songs
Empire Distribution singles
Song recordings produced by the Alchemist (musician)
Songs written by J. Cole
Songs written by The Alchemist (musician)